Nellie Marcia Lane Foster later Marcia Jarrett, (1897–1983), was a British artist notable as a printmaker, portrait painter and book illustrator.

Biography
Foster was born at Seaton in Devon but raised in Manchester before she moved to London. There she studied at the St John's Wood School of Art then at the Royal Academy Schools before enrolling at the Central School of Arts and Crafts where she was taught printmaking by Noel Rooke. At the Central School she was awarded a silver medal for figure painting in 1921.

After graduating Foster created a career that combined portrait painting with illustrating books and the production of advertising material. For almost twenty years Foster designed promotional material for William Hollins & Co and their various brands which included Viyella and Clydella. She also created illustrations for Cadbury, Nestlé, Clarks Shoes, Kodak and other brand names. Throughout her career Foster illustrated several dozen books. For a 1923 edition of The Merrie Tales of Jacques Tournebroche by Anatole France she created a set of sixteen wood engravings that were acquired for the British Museum print collection while the Metropolitan Museum of Art in New York holds a set of her prints for Canadian Fairy Tales from 1922.

Foster exhibited paintings and drawings in group exhibitions throughout her career, notably at the Royal Academy in London between 1952 and 1964 and with the Society of Women Artists from 1923 to 1935. She also exhibited works with the New English Art Club, at the Paris Salon and at the Art Institute of Chicago.  Foster was an elected member of the Arts and Crafts Exhibition Society and was an associate member of the Royal Society of Painter-Etchers and Engravers. Foster married the artist and writer Howard Dudley Jarrett in 1925 and died at Wincanton in Somerset.

Selected books illustrated
 
 The Golden Journey of Mr Paradyne by William John Locke
 The Headswoman, 1921, by Kenneth Grahame
 Canadian Fairy Tales, c. 1922, by Cyrus Macmillan
 The Merrie Tales of Jacques Tournebroche, 1923. by Anatole France
 Little Sea Dogs and Other Tales, 1925, by Anatole France
 Lets Do It, 1938, by Marcia Lane Foster
 Dusty's Windmill, 1949, by Kitty Barne
 Paris Adventure, 1954, by Viola Bayley
 Scottish Adventure, 1965, by Viola Bayley

References

External links

1897 births
1983 deaths
20th-century English painters
20th-century English women artists
Alumni of the Royal Academy Schools
Alumni of St John's Wood Art School
Alumni of the Central School of Art and Design
Artists from Devon
British women illustrators
English illustrators
English women painters
People from Seaton, Devon